Santorre Santarosa was one of four s built for the  (Royal Italian Navy) during the late 1920s. Completed in 1929, she played a minor role in the Spanish Civil War of 1936–1939 supporting the Spanish Nationalists.

Design and description
The Bandiera class was an improved and enlarged version of the preceding s. They displaced  surfaced and  submerged. Their crew numbered 53 officers and enlisted men.

For surface running, the boats were powered by two  diesel engines, each driving one propeller shaft. When submerged each propeller was driven by a  electric motor. They could reach  on the surface and  underwater.

The boats were armed with eight  torpedo tubes, four each in the bow and stern for which they carried a total of 12 torpedoes. They were also armed with a single  deck gun forward of the conning tower for combat on the surface. Their anti-aircraft armament consisted of two  machine guns.

Construction and career
Santorre Santarosa was laid down by Odero-Terni-Orlando at their Muggiano shipyard in 1928, launched on 22 October 1929 and completed later that year. During the Spanish Civil War, Santorre Santarosa was attempting to attack the  tanker  during nightfall on 11 August 1937 off Ras el Mustafa, French Tunisia, when the  torpedoed and sank the tanker before the submarine could reach firing position.

Notes

References

External links
 Santorre Santarosa Marina Militare website

Bandiera-class submarines
World War II submarines of Italy
1929 ships
Ships built in La Spezia
Ships built by OTO Melara